William J. Healy II (born c. 1962) is the former Mayor of the City of Canton, Ohio.

He was elected to his first term as Mayor of the City of Canton on November 6, 2007 Since his first term crime in the city has gone down 25 percent and the city's unemployment has hit a 30-year low at 5.1% recorded in November 2014.  Before becoming Mayor, he was elected in 2004 and 2006 to represent the 52nd District of the Ohio House of Representatives, which includes all of Canton and parts of Stark County.

Healy is a 1981 graduate of Canton McKinley Senior High School.  He earned his associate degree from the Stark Campus of Kent State University in Canton, a bachelor's degree from Rowan University in New Jersey, and a Master of Business Administration (MBA) degree from the NYU Stern School of Business in New York City.

He is the son of the late William J. Healy, a former Democratic city councilman and long-time state lawmaker in the Ohio House of Representatives.

References

External links
 http://www.cantonohio.gov/mayor/?pg=mayor

1960s births
Politicians from Canton, Ohio
Mayors of places in Ohio
Ohio Democrats
Living people
Kent State University alumni
Rowan University alumni
New York University Stern School of Business alumni
2012 United States presidential electors
21st-century American politicians